Tulbing is a municipality in the district of Tulln in the Austrian state of Lower Austria.
Tulbing is known for its rural landscape.

Population

References

External links

Cities and towns in Tulln District
Cadastral community of Tulln District